AIICO Pension Managers Limited is a pension funds management company in Nigeria. It is a 65 percent owned subsidiary of AIICO Insurance, a Nigeria Stock Exchange listed insurance services provider.

On 31st Decomber 2015, the company's total assets were NGN:1,337,546,000, with shareholders' funds of NGN:1,275,178,000. As at September 2016, the company had over 200,000 registered clients and has an excess of NGN:60 billion under management.

History
AIICO Pension Managers Limited was founded in February 2005. In April 2006, the company was awarded a licence to operate as a pension funds administrator (PFA). In August 2016, to mark 10 years in business, the company appointed Nollywood actress Joke Silva as its brand ambassador, to promote the company services and products.

See also
List of banks in Nigeria
Economy of Nigeria

References

Financial services companies of Nigeria
Companies based in Lagos
Financial services companies established in 2005
Pensions in Nigeria
Nigerian companies established in 2005